The following is a list of notable people who are or were barred from entering the United States. The Bureau of Immigration and Customs Enforcement (ICE) of the United States Department of Homeland Security (DHS) handles deportation in the United States, often in conjunction with advice from the U.S. Department of State. Such bans are often temporary, depending on the circumstances of each case, however, anyone previously deported or denaturalized is automatically barred from re-entering the United States without a waiver issued by the U.S. Department of State.

Currently Banned

Previously Banned

See also

 List of people deported from the United States
 List of denaturalized former citizens of the United States
 Illegal immigration to the United States
 U.S. Immigration and Customs Enforcement

References

External links
 U.S. Immigration and Customs Enforcement website

Immigration to the United States
Barred or excluded from the United States
United States

United States
United States immigration law
People barred or excluded